Jesse Oswald Meredith (1 April 1906 – fourth ¼ 1974) was a Welsh rugby union and professional rugby league footballer who played in the 1920s and 1930s.

Background
Jesse Meredith's birth was registered in Bedwellty district, Wales, and his death aged 68 was registered Liverpool district, Merseyside, England.

Playing career

International honours
Jesse Meredith won a cap for Wales while at Warrington in 1930.

Challenge Cup Final appearances
Jesse Meredith played right-, i.e. number 3, in Warrington's 3-5 defeat by Swinton in the 1927–28 Challenge Cup Final during the 1927–28 season at Central Park, Wigan, in front of a crowd of 33,909.

County Cup Final appearances
Jesse Meredith played, and scored a try in Warrington's 15-2 victory over Salford in the 1929–30 Lancashire County Cup Final during the 1929–30 season at Central Park, Wigan on Saturday 23 November 1929.

Club career
Jesse Meredith made his début for Warrington on Monday 17 October 1927, and he played his last match for Warrington on Saturday 25 April 1931.

References

External links
 (archived by web.archive.org) Statistics at wolvesplayers.thisiswarrington.co.uk

1906 births
1974 deaths
Abertillery RFC players
Rugby league players from Bedwellty
Rugby league locks
Rugby union players from Bedwellty
Wales national rugby league team players
Warrington Wolves players
Welsh rugby league players
Welsh rugby union players